Final Days of Planet Earth is a 2006 science fiction miniseries directed by Robert Lieberman and written by Roger Soffer. Starring Campbell Scott, Gil Bellows, and Daryl Hannah, the movie was produced by RHI Entertainment for the Hallmark Channel.

Plot

Three years ago, a team of astronaut miners completed a daring space expedition. They embarked on their journey home, but by the time the craft returned to Earth, their commander had gone mad—taking a terrible secret with him to a heavily guarded state asylum for the insane. Today, archeologist Lloyd Walker and entomologist Marianne Winters are among a select group of people who are questioning a possible link between the tragic space mission, the mystery of the commander’s madness, and a series of bizarre disappearances and strange accidents in San Francisco. The answer arrives when they stumble upon an underground colony of insect-like creatures harvesting human bodies for survival.

Liz Quinlan, now an employee of the mayor’s office, knows all too well the secret of the aliens, given that she is their Earth Queen. The city's highest representatives are her consorts. With police and government officials taken over by aliens masquerading as humans, Lloyd and Marianne realize they can trust no one, except William Phillips, the one man who knows the ultimate goal of the aliens. He also holds the mysterious key to their defeat—it's in his blood. He is the commander himself—the sole mission survivor being held as prisoner. Lloyd and Marianne must find him before he becomes a victim of an unearthly experiment.

Cast
 Daryl Hannah as Liz Quinlan
 Campbell Scott as William Phillips
 Gil Bellows as Lloyd Walker
 Sue Mathew as Marianne
 Patrick Gilmore as Spence
 Serge Houde as Korshaft
 Tygh Runyan as Nick
 Tina Milo Milivojevic as Bella
 William MacDonald as Cruikshank
 John Cassini as Jake Roth
 Michael Kopsa as Dalton

Reception

References

External links
 
 
 
 

2006 television films
2006 films
2006 science fiction films
Alien invasions in films
American science fiction films
American disaster films
Films about insects
Films set in San Francisco
Films shot in Vancouver
Hallmark Channel original films
Films directed by Robert Lieberman
2000s English-language films
2000s American films